Charlotte Deans (September 1, 1768 - March 14, 1859) was a strolling player who was born in Wigton, Cumbria.

Early life 
Deans was one of the three surviving children born to Alice Howard and attorney Henry Lowes.

Deans lived a respectable and comfortable life before she eloped with William Morel Johnston in Gretna Green, marrying in August 1787. Johnston, being an actor in Naylor’s Company of Comedians, was performing in a barn in Wigton in 1787. Deans was in the audience of this show which, incidentally, is how the two met. Deans later became an actor in his company. At this point, Deans led a hard life which can be attributed to the disreputable nature of the acting profession and her frequent pregnancies. 12 children were born to this couple before Johnston died in 1801. Following his death, Deans returned to her acting career, working with Mr Hobson’s Company of Comedians which at the time was based in Penrith.

In the year 1803, Charlotte Deans married Thomas Deans (1781 – 1859) who was a fellow-actor and the nascent manager. Accompanied by four of Charlotte's surviving children, the couple set out for an engagement in Montrose, where a new northern circuit was being developed. The family ended up quitting this profession because the Montrose managers failed to pay their agreed-upon wages. The family then spent their time travelling by foot and performing in barns and halls, performing the standard mixed bill of musical numbers, burlesqued Shakespeare and recitations wherever possible as they worked their way south through Fife and Lanarkshire. The Deans bore a total of five children while travelling and performing across central Scotland, the Scottish Borders and the north of England. The first child born to this couple (who was Charlotte Deans’s thirteenth child) was baptised in Lanark on 12 February 1805. Charlotte Deans spent her time between 1808 and 1811 touring the Scottish Borders and continued her acting profession into her late 60s. Some of her children followed in her footsteps and also took up careers in the field of acting.

A distinctive insight into Charlotte Deans’s life as a strolling player is accounted in her memoirs which were published in 1837. A 1995 play by Rona Munro’s entitled The Maiden Stone is partly inspired by Charlotte Deans’s life.

Death 
Deans died on March 14, 1859, in Bothergate, Carlisle.

References 

1768 births
1859 deaths
People from Wigton
19th-century English actresses
18th-century English actresses